Roberta "Bobbi" Cordano (born November 29, 1963) is the 11th president of Gallaudet University. Cordano is the first deaf woman to become president of Gallaudet University,  the first deaf woman to become president of a U.S. university, and the first woman and first openly LGBT person to be officially installed as Gallaudet President.

Life 
Cordano obtained her Juris Doctor degree at the University of Wisconsin, Madison in 1990. She was assistant attorney general for Minnesota.
She was assistant dean at the Hubert H. Humphrey Institute of Public Affairs at the University of Minnesota.

Cordano was awarded the Hubert Humphrey award by the University of Wisconsin. She is among the first ten deaf women in the United States to have earned a Juris Doctor (JD) degree and is among the first 50 deaf women to have earned a doctoral degree, overall.

Cordano is the first deaf woman to become president of Gallaudet University. Elisabeth Zinser, a hearing woman, held the Gallaudet presidency for less than one week amidst the March 1988 Deaf President Now protests. Zinser was never officially installed as president before her resignation.

References

External links

Common Past, Common Future: USDA & Gallaudet Create Opportunities for Students , USDA, Dec 09, 2016

Further reading
 

1963 births
Living people
Presidents of Gallaudet University
American deaf people
Beloit College alumni
University of Wisconsin Law School alumni
LGBT people from Washington, D.C.
Minnesota lawyers
University of Minnesota people
Women heads of universities and colleges